The Universal of National Unity, also known as the Declaration of National Unity, (translit.: Universal Natsional'noi Yednosti) is a declaration that was signed on August 3, 2006 by the President of Ukraine Viktor Yuschenko and leaders of the Ukrainian political parties represented in the parliament. It marked the resolution of the 2006 Parliamentary crisis in Ukraine. The process of negotiating and signing of the Universal caused a major public discussion of Ukraine's domestic and foreign policy.

References
Steven Lee Myers, Ukrainian Leader Strikes Deal With Critics, The New York Times, August 3, 2006
Steven Lee Myers, Ukraine Leader Forms Alliance With Rivals, The New York Times, August 4, 2006

External links
 Declaration of National Unity (full text)

Politics of Ukraine
History of Ukraine since 1991